John Zane may refer to:
 John Peder Zane, American journalist
 John Maxcy Zane, American lawyer